Show Bitch  is a 2010 comedy musical film by Nikos Zervos. The film is a parody of show business starring Anna Rezan, Renos Haralampidis and Dimitris Poulikakos. The costumes of the film were made by Bianca Nikolareizi.

The film premiered at the 2010 Thessaloniki International Film Festival, and opened in Greek theatres on 7 December 2010.

Plot
A teenage, beautiful and talented singer/songwriter Hrysa is discovered by a successful music industry guru Protonotarios who turns her into a star using media tricks and scandals, of which is that he tries to do a match making between her and his client Jay who is a pop idol, very handsome, young and not really talented.

Cast
 Anna Rezan as Hrysa
 Renos Haralampidis as Protonotarios
 Nasos Pappas as Jay
 Nikos Ziagos as Stelios
 Dimitris Poulikakos as Chief
 Kostas Gousgounis as Solon

References

External links 
 

2010 films
Films shot in Greece
2010s musical comedy films
Greek musical comedy films
2010 comedy films